Namiki Shōzō may refer to:

 Namiki Shōzō I (1730–1773), a Japanese bunraku playwright
 Namiki Shōzō II (died 1807), a Japanese kabuki playwright